GVAV-Rapiditas are a Dutch multi-sport club based in Groningen, Netherlands. Its first association football team competes in the seventh-tier Tweede Klasse since 2015, when it relegated from the Eerste Klasse. From 1954 to 1971, the club featured professional football. The professional branch was spun off and renamed FC Groningen in 1971.

History 
GVAV (Groninger Football and Athletics Association) was founded in 1915. The athletics club Rapiditas followed in 1917. Both club merged on 26 January 1921 under the new name "Groningse sportvereniging GVAV-Rapiditas", whose membership was only open to men. It was not until the 1970s that the club was also opened to female athletes.

The new association consisted of a number of departments, such as athletics, boxing, gymnastics, football and swimming. Rugby was also played for some time. Many sporting successes were achieved in all these branches of sport, making GVAV-Rapiditas a well-known name in the Netherlands.

Especially in the field of football, the club reached the highest level. In 1940, GVAV won the Northern Football Championship. Later, after the introduction of professional football, the club competed in the top-tier Eredivisie. Finally in 1965, it was decided to set up the professional standalone club Stichting Betaald Voetbal GVAV. When this professional club was promoted to the Eredivisie in 1971, the name was changed to FC Groningen.

In 1997, the organization of GVAV-Rapiditas was changed. The old association GVAV-Rapiditas became the Sports Federation GVAV-Rapiditas with a number of departments that became more or less independent clubs: gymnastics, triathlon and football. The athletics department merged in 2003 with ARGO '77 to become Groningen Atletiek. In September 2004, it was decided to dissolve the federation. Fellow consultation continued to exist at chairman level.

References 

Football clubs in Groningen (city)
1921 establishments in the Netherlands
FC Groningen
Multi-sport clubs in the Netherlands
Sports clubs in Groningen (city)